Dr. Dorothy Rowe (née Conn; 17 December 1930 – 25 March 2019) was an Australian psychologist and author, whose area of interest was depression. Born; Newcastle, NSW. Died Sydney, NSW.

Biography
Rowe came to England in her forties, working at Sheffield University and was the head of Lincolnshire Department of Clinical Psychology. In addition to her published works on depression, she was a regular columnist in the UK.

She spent her time working with depressed patients and, through listening to their stories, came to reject the medical model of mental illness, instead working within personal construct theory. She believed that depression is a result of beliefs which do not enable a person to live comfortably with themselves or the world. Most notably it is the belief in a "Just World" (that the bad are punished and the good rewarded) that exacerbates feelings of fear and anxiety if disaster strikes. Part of recovering is accepting that the external world is unpredictable and that we control relatively little of it.

In July 1989 Rowe made an extended appearance on the British television discussion programme After Dark alongside, among others, Steven Rose, Frank Cioffi, The Bishop of Durham and Michael Bentine.

The BBC were required to apologise to Dorothy Rowe in 2009 after the production editing of her radio interview misrepresented her views on the impact of religion in providing structure to people's lives.

Works
 What Should I Believe?, 2008, 
 Depression: The Way Out of Your Prison 3rd edition 2003 
 Friends & Enemies: Our Need to Love and Hate 
 Dorothy Rowe's Guide to Life 
 Wanting Everything: The Art of Happiness 
 Beyond Fear 
 Time on our side: Growing in Wisdom, Not Growing Old 
 Choosing Not Losing: The Experience of Depression 
 Living with the Bomb 
 The Courage to Live 
 The Successful Self 
 Breaking the Bonds: Understanding Depression, Finding Freedom 
 The Real Meaning of Money 
 My Dearest Enemy, My Dangerous Friend, making and breaking sibling bonds 
 Why We Lie

References

External links
 Official website

Academics of the University of Sheffield
Australian psychologists
Australian women psychologists
1930 births
2019 deaths